Qaradaş (also, Karadash and Qaradağ) is a village and municipality in the Tovuz Rayon of Azerbaijan.  It has a population of 353.  The municipality consists of the villages of Qaradaş, Qayadibi, and Qonaqlı.

References 

Populated places in Tovuz District